Wiener Peaks is a group of nunataks 5 nautical miles (9 km) northeast of Mount Passel in the Ford Ranges, Marie Byrd Land. Discovered on aerial flights over this area by the United States Antarctic Service (USAS) (1939–41) and named for Murray A. Wiener, auroral observer at West Base during this expedition. The northernmost peak is Greer Peak.

See also
 Morriss Peak

Nunataks of Marie Byrd Land